Leopard Lake is an Australian electro-pop duo composed of producer Sam Ford (Pond, Abbe May) and vocalist Storm Wyness.

Career 
Leopard Lake was formed in 2017 when the duo began creating and recording music in Ford's home studio located in Perth, Western Australia. Leopard Lake released their first single "Thinking of You" later that year. Jay Watson, Tame Impala/ Pond's multi-instrumentalist aka GUM remixed "Thinking Of You" which was released in early 2018 and received airplay on Australian digital radio station Triple J Unearthed. Leopard Lake's sophomore single, "Further" was released 23 March 2018.

EPs 
 Leopard Lake (2018)

Singles 
 "Thinking of You" (2017)
 "Thinking of You" (GUM Remix) (2018)
 "Further" (2018)
 "Heart of Yours" (2019)

References

External links 
 Leopard Lake
 Leopard Lake Instagram Page
 

Australian pop music groups